Doug Spearman (born September 3, 1962, in Washington, D.C.) is an American actor. His career highlights include work on such television shows as Noah's Arc, Star Trek: Voyager, The Drew Carey Show, The Hughleys, Charmed, Gideon's Crossing, MAD TV, Girlfriends and Profiler.

Career 
He has starred in such productions as the American premiere of the AIDS drama The Ice Pick, The Men's Room, Moscow, The Bullpen Boys, A Few Good Men, and the world premiere of South Coast Repertory's production of The Hollow Lands. Doug co-starred in the motion picture Cradle 2 the Grave with Jet Li and DMX and Any Day Now with Alan Cumming and Frances Fisher.

On television Spearman starred as Professor Chance Counter in the groundbreaking series Noah's Arc on LOGO and the feature film continuing the TV show's story, Noah's Arc: Jumping the Broom.

Spearman also worked as a writer/producer/director and creative director at ABC, CBS, NBC, UPN, Soapnet, BET, Logo TV, and E! Entertainment Television creating more than 2,000 television promos and multi-platform ad campaigns and marketing strategies in his career.

In 2006, Spearman created a television and film development and production company called The Ogden Group Entertainment.  That year he also produced and directed his first documentary, "Aretha", on the life of the Queen of Soul, Aretha Franklin, which aired in January 2007. In 2009 the Directors Guild of America commissioned Doug to write a film entitled Pirates 3.0. The film was produced by Randal Kleiser and directed by Jeremy Kagan and shot entirely on the Warner Brothers lot.

He wrote and directed the feature films Hot Guys with Guns (2013) and From Zero to I Love You (2019).

Awards 
Spearman has been honored with many awards, including a Leadership Award from the Human Rights Campaign which was presented before the United States Senate; the Connie Norman Award from C.S.W. for outstanding achievement in fostering racial, ethnic, religious and gender unity within the LGBT community; The Advocacy Award from the National Education Association's LGBTQ+ Caucus; and an Image Award from the Jordan Rustin Coalition in Los Angeles.

Personal life
Spearman grew up in Hyattsville, Maryland and attended Indiana University. Spearman is gay.

References

External links 

1962 births
Living people
American film directors
American male film actors
American male television actors
American gay actors
Male actors from Washington, D.C.
LGBT African Americans
LGBT film directors
21st-century American LGBT people